The L.A. Complex (originally Highland Gardens) is a Canadian drama television series that premiered on CTV on January 10, 2012, subsequently airing on MuchMusic. It also began airing in the United States on April 24, 2012, on The CW. The series stars Cassie Steele as Abby Vargas, an aspiring actress who moves to Los Angeles with nothing but her Maple Leafs hockey bag and dreams of being a famous actress. As described in CTV publicity materials, "The L.A. Complex follows the lives of twenty year olds living in the same apartment complex in L.A. trying to make it as actors, dancers, producers and comedians. Relationships begin and end, the need to succeed is tested and all characters are pushed to their breaking points."

On December 3, 2012, it was announced that The L.A. Complex was not renewed for a third season by Much and Bell Media, but with a possibility that the series could be picked up by another network. On December 20, 2012, The CW announced that the series was not going to be picked up by the network, making it officially canceled.

Cast and characters

Main
 Jonathan Patrick Moore as Connor Lake, a good-looking and successful actor from Australia who suffers from depression and self-harming
 Joe Dinicol as Nick Wagner, a geeky, lighthearted and socially awkward stand-up comedian originally from Calgary. Nick often has troubles in both his career and his love life due to his reputation of being a pushover.
 Andra Fuller as Kaldrick King (real name Sean Dougan), a successful but troubled and bad-tempered rapper originally from Oakland, California, who is attempting to make a comeback in the music world after a stint in prison, as well as hide a secret of being a closeted homosexual
 Chelan Simmons as Alicia Lowe (season 1; guest star season 2), a sensitive, aspiring dancer originally from Regina who will "do whatever it takes" to make ends meet
 Cassie Steele as Abby Vargas, an aspiring, talented, but very naive, accident-prone young actress originally from Toronto who moves to Los Angeles to pursue her dream, only to discover the ruthless true nature of show business
 Benjamin Charles Watson as Tariq Muhammad (season 1; guest star season 2), a quiet and timid hip-hop music producer/intern originally from Montreal who works with Kaldrick King, and eventually becomes his lover
 Jewel Staite as Raquel Westbrook, a 30-year-old cynical, once successful actress from Halifax who fears her career is now over
 Dayle McLeod as Beth Pirelli (season 2), a headstrong teenager from Winnipeg who moves into The Lux with her younger brother Simon, after their father abandons them
 Michael Levinson as Simon Pirelli (season 2), a child actor who moves into The Lux with his older sister Beth
 Georgina Reilly as Sabrina Reynolds (season 2; guest star season 1), a ruthless and intelligent comedian, who acts as a rival to Nick for the entire duration of the series. She is the only main character who is born and raised in Los Angeles.

Recurring
 Ennis Esmer as Eddie Demir, the landlord and manager of The Lux Motel. Eddie is loud, fun and excitable. He is shown to being to pursue an acting career.
 Paul F. Tompkins as himself, a straight-talking comedian
 Dayo Ade as DyNasty, Kaldrick King's focused and strict music producer. He is aware of King's homosexuality but pretends not to know for he is well aware that King will lose literally everything should he ever publicly come out about his sexual orientation.
 Kristopher Turner as Cameron "Cam" Logan, a resident of The Lux who focuses on making a film with Kevin and Raquel. He also starts a relationship with Beth during season 2.
 Jordan Johnson-Hinds as Kevin Rainer, Cam's filmmaking partner
 Aaron Abrams as Ricky Lloyd, a once successful child actor, Ricky's career has dried up due to his drug addiction. He makes a sex tape with Alicia to try and boost his profile in season 1, and later enters a celebrity rehab show in season 2.
 Kate Todd as Katee (season 1), Connor's co-star
 Alan Thicke as Donald Gallagher (season 2), the strict creator and producer of Saving Grace
 Ryan Belleville as Scott Cray (season 2), Nick and Sabrina's lecherous, drug-addicted boss
 Brett Dier as Brandon Kelly (season 2), an actor on Saving Grace who engages in a three-way relationship with Abby and Laura
 Megan Hutchings as Laura Knight (season 2), an actress on Saving Grace who engages in a three-way relationship with Abby and Brandon
 William Stewart as Rook (season 2), Kaldrick's long-term friend who is very loyal and attempts to help Kaldrick as much as he can. He also knows about Kaldrick's homosexuality and helps him try to keep it a secret. In the series finale, he shoots and kills Kaldrick's rapper rival, Infinite Jest.
 Rebecca Dalton as Dita (season 2), a quiet resident of The Lux
 Krista Allen as Jennifer Bell (season 2), a successful actress who starts a "show-mance" with Connor to remain relevant in the acting business
 Eugene Clark as Walter Dougan (season 2), Kaldrick King's estranged father with whom Kaldrick attempts to form a reconciliation. He runs a halfway house in Downtown Los Angeles for paroled ex-convicts and homeless teenage runaways, and who is also an ex-convict and recovering alcoholic and drug addict. He has no idea about his son's homosexuality because of having not seen Kaldrick since he abandoned him when he was a young child, and he remains oblivious despite Kaldrick throwing hints to him at times.
 Stephan James as Infinite Jest (season 2), Kaldrick's rapper rival
 Jarod Joseph as Christopher Taylor (season 2), Kaldrick King's openly gay lawyer boyfriend
 Louis Ferreira as Dean Pirelli (season 2), Beth and Simon's father
 Steve Byers as Gray Sanders (season 2), Abby's serviceman boyfriend
 Tori Anderson as Charlotte Lake (season 2), Connor's estranged sister
 Matt Murray as Manny (season 2), Raquel's co-worker at the restaurant

Development and production
CTV's parent company, Bell Media, ordered six episodes of the series in August 2011. Shooting and production of the series began in mid-2011, with both Toronto and Los Angeles as primary locations.

Several hours prior to the series premiere, Bell Media announced that The L.A. Complex had been picked up by The CW to air in the United States later in the spring. On March 22, 2012, Bell Media ordered a further 13 episodes to be produced for the first season.

The CW picked up the second season of the show for the network's summer schedule, to begin airing on Tuesday, July 17, 2012. Later, starting on August 27, 2012, the series moved to Mondays 8/7c as a lead-in for repeats of the new season of America's Next Top Model.

Episodes

Season 1 (2012)

Season 2 (2012)
Production on the second and final season began in mid-April, and the season premiered in Canada on July 17, 2012. The 13-episode second and final season was simulcast by The CW. Alan Thicke joined the cast as Donald Gallagher, a hot-headed actor-director-producer. Also guest-starring is Louis Ferreira as Beth and Simon's father Dean Pirelli.

Reception

Critical response
The L.A. Complex received mostly positive reviews from critics. On Rotten Tomatoes, the first season has a fresh rating of 100% based on 11 reviews, with a weighted average of 7.22/10. The site's critics consensus reads, "The L.A. Complex appeals with natural, humorous dialogue, and a focus on the real struggles of characters in the entertainment business." On Metacritic, it has a score of 70 out of 100 based on 13 critics, indicating "generally favorable reviews".

Rob Owen of the Pittsburgh Post-Gazette gave the show a positive review stating, "For the type of show it sets out to be, this Complex is surprisingly, well, complex." Alan Sepinwall of HitFix also gave the show a positive review, describing the show as "a primetime soap, but one that's genuinely more interested in what the characters want to do for a living than in who they're sleeping with."

The TVLine team said of The L.A. Complex, "It's like everything you'd want from a CW soap, and it delivers", and added that it contains "TV's most interesting, unexpected romance." Entertainment Weekly gave the show an A− and declared that it was "summer's hidden gem", stating that it was "unexpectedly smart", and that the bad decisions of the characters made it "far more interesting, relatable, and likable than the glambots we normally see on L.A.-set dramas".

In an unfavorable review, Tom Gliatto of People Weekly described the show as a "blah drama about kids living in an LA apartment complex while hustling for big breaks."

Ratings
 The L.A. Complex premiered on January 10, 2012, in Canada. It was previewed on CTV drawing 351,000 viewers as well as 60,000 on its regular channel MuchMusic.
 Episode 2 aired January 17, 2012, on MuchMusic drawing 87,000 viewers.
 Episode 3 aired January 24, 2012, on MuchMusic drawing 40,000 viewers.
 Episode 4 aired January 31, 2012, on MuchMusic drawing 44,000 viewers.
 Episode 5 aired February 7, 2012, on MuchMusic drawing 16,000 viewers.
 Episode 6 (season finale) aired February 14, 2012, on MuchMusic drawing 22,000 viewers.

However, after its initial airing in the United States, the series received the lowest-ever ratings for a broadcast drama series premiere, despite its generally favorable reviews.

Home media
On August 13, 2015, Echo Bridge Entertainment released The L.A. Complex: The Complete Series on DVD in Region 1.

Reboot
On October 3, 2018, it was announced that a reboot of the series was in the works at The CW with original creator Martin Gero and writer Brendan Gall set to executive produce. The "sequel" project, hailing from Gero's production company Quinn's House in association with Warner Bros. Television, is based on the original series, but follows "a new crop of tenants who move into the Luxe hotel in the heart of Hollywood—a ragtag commune of twentysomethings all hustling to make it as actors, dancers, producers or comedians. Relationships rise and fall, beliefs and values are tested, as the drive to succeed pushes all characters to their breaking points." On February 8, 2019, The CW passed on picking up the script to pilot, reportedly due to a "numbers game" between Warner Bros. Television and The CW's other production studio CBS Television Studios. Because The CW is a joint effort between CBS and Warner Bros., the network orders an equal number of pilot episodes from each studio. However, The CW decided to keep the project in the works for the following development cycle. After Gero inked a new development deal with Universal Television in May 2020, moving away from Warner Bros. Television, he confirmed the following month on Instagram that the reboot would not happen.

References

External links
 

2010s Canadian drama television series
2012 Canadian television series debuts
2012 Canadian television series endings
CTV Television Network original programming
The CW original programming
English-language television shows
Much (TV channel) original programming
Television series about actors
Television series by Bell Media
Television series by DHX Media
Television shows filmed in Toronto
Television shows filmed in Los Angeles
Television shows set in Los Angeles
Works about human migration